The Defence Council or the Council of Defense of the USSR was a high military advisory body which aided and assisted the Government of the Soviet Union and the Central Committee of the Communist Party of the Soviet Union in the implementation of military policy by the Soviet Armed Forces. It operated between 1955-1991. At the end of its existence, it was known as the Defense Council under the President of the Soviet Union.

History
On 20 December 1954, a secret resolution of the Presidium of the Central Committee of the CPSU "On the Creation of the Supreme Council of Defense of the USSR" was issued. On 7 February 1955, a secret resolution of the Presidium of the Central Committee of the CPSU approved the resolution of the Central Committee and the Council of Ministers the council.

The first composition included the following:

Nikita Khrushchev
Nikolai Bulganin
Klement Voroshilov 
Lazar Kaganovich
Vyacheslav Molotov
Georgy Zhukov
Aleksandr Vasilevsky

The Military Council was created as a deliberative body under the Defense Council. The position of the Defense Council in the system of public authorities was enshrined in Article 121 of the 1977 Constitution of the USSR, according to which the Supreme Soviet approved its composition. Obligatory participation of the members of the Presidium of the CPSU Central Committee was a given, with the heads of government bodies and state organizations also being invited to its meetings. As a rule, it held its meetings at regular intervals as well as during emergency situations such as during the Cuban Missile Crisis in 1962.

After the establishment in 1990 of the office of President of the Soviet Union, the council became an exclusive advisory body to the head of state. This was abolished by decree of President Gorbachev on 25 December 1991. Only to be succeeded by the republican security councils in the former Soviet republics as well as the Security Council of the RSFSR over the next 2 years.

Leadership
On 7 February 1955, by decree of the Presidium of the CPSU Central Committee "On the Creation of the Defense Council of the USSR" approved the draft resolution of the CPSU Central Committee, the Presidium of the Supreme Soviet of the USSR, and the Council of Ministers of the USSR on the creation of the Defense Council.

Chairmen

The office of Chairman was concurrently held by the General Secretary of the Communist Party of the Soviet Union:

Nikita Khrushchev (7 February 1955 – 14 October 1964)
Leonid Brezhnev (14 October 1964 – 10 November 1982)
Yuri Andropov (12 November 1982 – 9 February 1984)
Konstantin Chernenko (13 February 1984 – 10 March 1985)
Mikhail Gorbachev (11 March 1985 – 25 December 1991)

Secretaries
The Secretaries of the Defense Council were concurrently Deputy Chiefs of the General Staff of the Armed Forces:

Colonel General Nikolai Pavlovsky (1955–1959)
Army General Semyon Ivanov (1959–1962)
Colonel General Mikhail Povaliy (1962–1969)
Army General Mikhail Kozlov (1969–1974)
Marshal of the Soviet Union Sergey Akhromeyev (1974–1986)
Colonel General Sergey Dikov (1986–1989)
Lieutenant General Anatoly Chuvakin (1989–1991)

See also
Security Council of Russia
Minister of Defence (Soviet Union)
Council of Labor and Defense
State Defense Committee
National Security Commission of the Communist Party of China
National Defense Council of East Germany
Revolutionary Military Council

References

Government of the Soviet Union
Military of the Soviet Union
Soviet Union